KMTA (1050 AM) is a radio station licensed to serve Miles City, Montana.  The station is owned by Marks Radio Group, and licensed to Custer County Community Broadcasting. It airs an oldies format.

The station was assigned the KMTA call letters by the Federal Communications Commission on September 23, 1986.

References

External links
KMTA website

MTA
Oldies radio stations in the United States
Custer County, Montana
Radio stations established in 1986
1986 establishments in Montana
Miles City, Montana